Roman II of Moldavia, (1426 – 2 July 1448) was the son of Iliaş of Moldavia and Maria Olszanska from the noble Polish family of Olshanski. He was a co-ruler of Moldova in 1447–1448, ruling together with his uncle Petru after killing his other uncle, Stephen II of Moldavia, with Polish support. Later, due to the Ottoman invasion of Moldavia, he had to flee to Krakow where he died at the age of 22.

References
Ştefan Ştefănescu, Istoria medie a României, Bucharest, Vol. I, 1991

Rulers of Moldavia
15th-century Romanian people
House of Bogdan-Mușat
1426 births
1448 deaths